The Count of Pardiac was a title in the French nobility.

It was held by:
 Bernard d'Armagnac, Count of Pardiac (1424–1462)
 Jacques d'Armagnac, Duke of Nemours (1462–1477)
 Jean d'Armagnac, Duke of Nemours (1484–1500)
 Louis d'Armagnac, Duke of Nemours (1500–1503)

References

Counts of Pardiac